Agathe kann's nicht lassen was an Austrian and German detective comedy television series which ran between 2005 and 2007. It was based upon Agatha Christie's Miss Marple.

List of Episodes

See also
List of German television series

External links
 

German crime television series
2005 Austrian television series debuts
2007 Austrian television series endings
2005 German television series debuts
2007 German television series endings
Austrian television series
ORF (broadcaster) original programming
2000s Austrian television series
Television shows set in Bavaria
German-language television shows
Das Erste original programming